Cornbury Park is an estate near Charlbury, Oxfordshire. It comprises about 5000 acres, mostly farmland and woods, including a remnant of the Wychwood Forest, and was the original venue for the Cornbury Music Festival and later the Wilderness Festival.

History

Cornbury used to be a royal hunting estate. The park is first mentioned in the Domesday book as a "demesne forest of the king", which was used for the hunting of deer.

Cornbury House
Cornbury House is a two-storey, eleven-bay Grade I listed English country house. Built in the late 16th century, it was enlarged and altered several times, first in 1632-33 by Nicholas Stone for Henry Danvers, 1st Earl of Danby. The frontage was by the mason and sculptor Timothy Strong. Further alterations were carried out in 1663-77 by Hugh May who built the east front, the stables, and the chapel (1663–68) for Edward Hyde, 1st Earl of Clarendon. In 1901–6, John Belcher removed addition of c. 1850, and altered the house further for Vernon Watney. Belcher's work was mostly demolished c. 1972.

Current use
Cornbury Park is currently the home of Robin Cayzer, 3rd Baron Rotherwick, a Conservative hereditary peer who runs it as a business. Cayzer has developed business units for rental there, and hosts the Wilderness Festival.

References

External links
Cornbury Park

Country parks in Oxfordshire
Country houses in Oxfordshire
Grade I listed houses in Oxfordshire